In enzymology, an isoliquiritigenin 2'-O-methyltransferase is an enzyme that catalyzes the chemical reaction

S-adenosyl-L-methionine + isoliquiritigenin  S-adenosyl-L-homocysteine + 2'-O-methylisoliquiritigenin

Thus, the two substrates of this enzyme are S-adenosyl methionine and isoliquiritigenin, whereas its two products are S-adenosylhomocysteine and 2'-O-methylisoliquiritigenin.

This enzyme belongs to the family of transferases, specifically those transferring one-carbon group methyltransferases.  The systematic name of this enzyme class is S-adenosyl-L-methionine:isoliquiritigenin 2'-O-methyltransferase. Other names in common use include chalcone OMT, and CHMT.

References 

 
 

EC 2.1.1
Enzymes of unknown structure
Chalconoids metabolism